Dragon Eye Congee: A Dream of Love is a 2005 Taiwanese romance film set in the 1960s. Produced by Lee Hsing and directed by Allen Chang, the film stars Singapore's Fann Wong, Hong Kong's Shaun Tam and Taiwan's Ivy Yin.

Plot
Based on a short story of the same name written in the 1950s by the Taiwanese intellectual and democracy activist Bo Yang, Dragon Eye Congee tells the story of a second-generation Taiwanese American, Shaun Tam, who, since childhood, has repeatedly dreamt about the same woman in the same scenes, complete with a haunting melody and the fragrant smell of rice congee with dried longan.

He is totally mystified about the significance of the dream until he comes to Taiwan for the first time on a business trip and stumbles upon an old house and a woman played by Fann Wong, resembling those in his dreams. Eventually, he realizes that the woman was his lover in a previous lifetime in Taiwan.

Cast 
 Fann Wong
 Shaun Tam
 Ivy Yin
 Chiu Ting

Production
Produced by veteran Taiwanese director Lee Hsing of Lee's Production Ltd (李行工作室有限公司), he came out of retirement to produce his first film in 20 years (since 1984), funding NT$2 million.  The director of the film is Allen Chang Kuo-Fu, the winner of the Golden Horse Award Best Short Film in 2000.

Festival
The film was nominated for five categories at the inaugural Asian Festival of First Films 2005, held in Singapore. The film was screened at the Golden Horse Film Festival in 2005.

External links 
 Official website
 

2005 films
Taiwanese romance films
2000s Mandarin-language films
2000s romance films